Disney's Friends for Change (also referred to as Friends for Change: Project Green) is a pro-social "green" initiative that started in the summer of 2009.

History
Disney stars stress environmental issues in the campaign, encouraging fans to take action. The year-long campaign draws on how Disney stars connect with younger fans. Demi Lovato, Miley Cyrus, Selena Gomez, and the Jonas Brothers were among the original stars in the 30 second to 2 minute public service announcements currently airing on Disney Channel. As part of the initiative, kids will have the ability to choose how Disney will invest one million dollars in various environmental programs. The initiative was presented instead of the 2009 and 2010 Disney Channel Games. The first Disney's Friends for Change Games premiered June 24, 2011 on Disney Channel, replacing the Disney Channel Games. A special 30 minute program called "Lights, Camera, Take Action! Backstage with Disney's Friends for Change" that was shown on Disney Channel directly after Wizards of Waverly Place: The Movie, was hosted by Tiffany Thornton and directed by Michael Blum and Tracy Pion. It showcased behind-the-scenes footage during the making of the project.

When a show ends and the stars begin to transition their way out of Disney Channel, they leave the initiative as well. This is the case for the Hannah Montana and Jonas stars among the other stars that have left. , there are 36 Disney Channel stars participating in the initiative, and there are 22 former Disney Channel stars who have left the initiative.

Friends for Change Games

The first Disney's Friends for Change Games was announced for the summer of 2011, replacing the Disney Channel Games, and premiered on June 24, 2011.

Participants
Below is a list of past and present stars participating in the initiative.

Former

Donations

Send It On

Make a Wave

"Make a Wave" is a song sung by Demi Lovato and Joe Jonas for Disney's Friends for Change, a charity group formed by Disney for their "Friends for Change" campaign. The song was written by Scott Krippayne and Jeff Peabody, the same team that penned Jordin Sparks' song "This Is My Now" for American Idol. "Make a Wave" was introduced and performed at Walt Disney World Resort in Lake Buena Vista, Florida. It was also featured in the 2009 Disneynature film Oceans.

Background
The song debuted on February 26 on Radio Disney, reaching as high as number 4 on the Top 30 Countdown, while the music video had its world premiere on Disney Channel on March 14 and launched online the following day at Disney.com. "Make a Wave" was available beginning March 15 on iTunes, with all proceeds benefiting environmental charities through the Disney Worldwide Conservation Fund. Oceans hit theaters April 22, 2010 (Earth Day). It peaked at number 84 on Billboard Hot 100.

Music video
The music video premiered on Disney Channel on March 14 and launched online the following day at Disney.com. It was directed by Michael Blum and Tracy Pion, and was filmed at Point Dume in Malibu. The video features Joe and Demi enjoying the beach and performing the song, intercut with footage from the film Oceans.

Chart performance
The song peaked at number 84 on the Billboard Hot 100. The song was a success on Radio Disney's Top 30 Countdown.

Track listings
U.S. / Digital Download
"Make a Wave" (Digital Download) – 4:01
"Make a Wave" (Instrumental) – 3:48

Charts

Awards

We Can Change the World

"We Can Change the World" is a song sung by Bridgit Mendler for the Disney's Friends for Change campaign and specifically, for the first Disney's Friends for Change Games. The song was written by Joacim Persson and Mendler herself.

Background
The song premiered on Radio Disney on June 10. With its release, Disney donated $250,000 to the Disney Worldwide Conservation Fund. The song was made available for download on the Friends for Change website and on iTunes on June 11. All proceeds went to environmental charities, similar to the other songs released for the initiative.

Music video
The music video premiered on Disney Channel on June 10. It was directed by Art Spigel, director of the Disney Channel Games, and was filmed on-location at Disney Golden Oak Ranch in Los Angeles, California. The song features Mendler happily singing in a park with a camera in her hand and into a microphone. Kids from all over the world eventually join her in singing the anthem. Some of the kids include international Disney Channel stars Valeria Baroni, Jorge Blanco, Olavo Cavalheiro, Nicole Ishida, Murtuza Kutianawala and Eve Ottino.

Track listings
U.S. / Digital download
"We Can Change the World" – 3:19

U.K. / Digital download
"We Can Change the World" – 3:19
"We Can Change the World (Instrumental)" – 3:19

Release history

Rise

"Rise" is a song sung by McClain Sisters for the Disney's Friends for Change campaign for the second Disney's Friends for Change Games. It was also used in the end credits of the Disneynature film, Chimpanzee. The song was written by the McClains.

Background
The song premiered on iTunes on March 23, 2012.

Music video
The music video premiered on Vevo March 26, 2012.

Track listings
U.S. / Digital Download
"Rise" (Digital Download) – 4:11

Charts

References

External links
 

Disney Channel
Hollywood Records singles
Walt Disney Records singles
Environmental organizations based in the United States
2009 establishments in the United States